Love Me is the fourth album by American pop star Yvonne Elliman produced by Freddie Perren and released by RSO Records in 1977. This album features a cover of Barbara Lewis' tune, "Hello Stranger", the title cut, which is another cover of The Bee Gees' tune and "I Can't Get You Outa My Mind".

Track listing
All tracks composed by Beatrice Verdi and Christine Yarian; except where indicated
"Love Me" (Barry Gibb, Robin Gibb)
"Hello Stranger" (Barbara Lewis)
"I Can't Get You Outa My Mind" 
"I Know" (Yvonne Elliman)
"Without You (There Ain't No Love at All)"
"Good Sign" (Carole Bayer Sager, David Wolfert, Melissa Manchester)
"She'll Be the Home"
"(I Don't Know Why) I Keep Hanging On"
"I'd Do It Again" (Verdi, Yarian, Gary Lohman)
"Uphill (Peace of Mind)" (Frederick Knight)

Personnel 
 Yvonne Elliman - vocals, guitar
 Bob "Boogie" Bowles - guitar
 Gary Starbuck - guitar
 Scott Edwards - bass guitar
 Freddie Perren - keyboards, percussion
 John Barnes - keyboards, percussion
 Paulinho da Costa, Bob Zimmitti, Gary Coleman - percussion
 James Gadson - drums
 David Blumberg, Don Peake, Sam Brown III, Wade Marcus - string and horn arrangements

External links
http://www.discogs.com/Yvonne-Elliman-Love-Me/master/133319
http://www.cdbaby.com/cd/yvonneelliman
http://rateyourmusic.com/release/album/yvonne_elliman/love_me/
https://yvonneelliman.bandcamp.com/album/love-me
 

Albums produced by Freddie Perren
RSO Records albums
1977 albums
Albums arranged by Wade Marcus
Albums recorded at Total Experience Recording Studios